Sarah Arapta, is a businesswoman and corporate executive in Uganda, the third-largest economy in the East African Community. She is the managing director and chief executive officer (CEO) of Citibank Uganda, a financial service provider, licensed as a commercial bank by the Bank of Uganda, the central bank and national banking regulator.

Background and education
She was born in circa 1970s. She studied at local primary and secondary schools before she entered Makerere University, the oldest and largest public university in the country. She graduated with a Bachelor of Arts degree in Economics. She also holds a Master of Business Administration degree, awarded by Heriot-Watt University in Edinburgh, Scotland, United Kingdom.

Career
Arapta was employed at Stanbic Bank Uganda Limited for a period of nearly five years. She started there as the Head Corporate Banking before becoming the Head of Investment Banking. She transferred to Barclays Bank of Uganda in January 2014 as the Director of Corporate and Investment Banking, serving in that capacity for one year and six months. In January 2016, she was appointed managing director and CEO of Citibank Uganda. She credited with growing Citibank Uganda's assets from UGX:951.1 billion ($262 million) in January 2016 to UGX:1.409 trillion ($388.3 million) in January 2022.

Other considerations
Arapta is  member of the five-person executive committee of the Uganda Bankers Association (UBA), where she served as the Chief Auditor, from May 2018 until May 2020. In May 2022, she was elected chairperson of UBA, replacing Mathias Katamba, who served in that role from 2020 until 2022. Her term runs until May 2024.

See also
 Annet Nakawunde Mulindwa
 List of banks in Uganda
 Banking in Uganda
 Economy of Uganda

References

External links
 Profile of Sarah Arapta, Chief Executive, Citibank Uganda

Living people
21st-century Ugandan businesswomen
21st-century Ugandan businesspeople
Ugandan bankers
Makerere University alumni
Year of birth missing (living people)
People from Kampala
Ugandan women chief executives